Telemundo is an American broadcast television television network owned by the Telemundo Television Group division of NBCUniversal, which was launched in 1984 as NetSpan. , the network currently has 18 owned-and-operated stations, and current affiliation agreements with 65 other television stations. Telemundo maintains a national cable network feed that is distributed directly to cable, satellite and IPTV providers in various media markets not listed in this article, as an alternative method of distribution in areas without either the availability or the demand for a locally based owned-and-operated or affiliate station.

This article is a listing of current, pending and former Telemundo-affiliated stations in the United States and U.S. possessions (including subchannel affiliates, satellite stations and select low-power translators), with outlets owned by its parent company's broadcast television subsidiary Telemundo Station Group separated from privately owned affiliates, and arranged in alphabetical order by city of license and/or Designated Market Area. There are links to and articles on each of the broadcast stations, describing their histories, local programming and technical information, such as broadcast frequencies.

The station's virtual (PSIP) channel number follows the call letters. For the table for the owned-and-operated outlets, the number in parentheses that follows is the station's actual digital channel number; the digital channel number is listed as a separate column in the list of private affiliates. The article also includes a list of its former affiliate stations, which is also based on the station's city of license or market, and denotes the years in which the station served as a Telemundo affiliate as well as the current status of the corresponding channel that carried the network.

Owned-and-operated stations

Stations are listed alphabetically by state and city of license.
Notes:
1) Two boldface asterisks appearing following a station's call letters (**) indicate a station that was an original Telemundo-owned station either from the network's inception as NetSpan in 1984 or as part of the relaunch as Telemundo in 1987;
2) This list does not include NBCUniversal-owned stations affiliated with NBC; individual lists are available in the articles List of NBC television affiliates (table) and List of NBC television affiliates (by U.S. state).

Telemundo-affiliated stations

United States

Former affiliates

Notes and references

Station notes

References

Telemundo